The Wind Kissed Pictures is an EP by American deathrock band Christian Death, and is the debut release featuring Valor Kand on vocals. It was released in 1985 through Nostradamus Records and has spawned one single, "Believers of the Unpure". On the album, the band's title is made longer, calling themselves For Sin and Sacrifice Must We Die a Christian Death. Allmusic gave the album two stars out of five. However, they claimed it to be "some of the finest post-Rozz Williams work Christian Death would produce."

Release 
The Wind Kissed Pictures was released in 1985 through Nostradamus Records on twelve-inch vinyl. As well as a regular 4-track vinyl release, it was released with a single sided seven-inch of the song "Lacrima Christi". On the vinyl release, side A plays at 45 rpm and side B 33 ⅓ rpm. The same year they released "Believers of the Unpure" as a single on 12" vinyl, backed with "Between Youth" and "After the Rain". In 1986, the EP was made available on cassette with a new cover in the US, as well as it being released again on vinyl.

Track listing 
All songs written by Valor Kand, except where noted

A side
"Believers of the Unpure" - 8:32

B side
"Overture" - 3:32
"The Wind Kissed Pictures" - 7:06 (Valor Kand, Barry Galvin, Johann Schumann)
"The Lake of Fire" - 2:39

Release history

Personnel 
Christian Death
 Valor Kand - lead vocals, guitar, keyboards
 Barry Galvin - guitar, keyboards
 Gitane DeMone - keyboards, backing vocals
 Johann Schumann - bass
 David Glass - drums

Design
 Cover - Valor Kand, David Glass, Johann Schumann
 Booklet design - Valor Kand
 Illustration - Renzo Vespignani (pages 2, 4, 6)
 Back cover poem - Gitane DeMone

References 

1985 EPs
Christian Death albums